Timing may refer to:

Timing, the tracking or planning of the spacing of events in time

Media
 Timing (manhwa), a South Korean manhwa
 "Timing", a song by rapper YK Osiris
 Timing (EP), a 2014 Kim Hyun-joong EP
 Timing (film), a 2014 Korean film